Laxton is a village in North Northamptonshire,  east of Corby and approximately  west of the A43. At the time of the 2001 census, the parish's population was 160 people, increasing to 234 at the 2011 census.

History
The villages name means 'Leaxa's farm/settlement' or 'Lax's farm/settlement'.

The village was rebuilt by George Freke Evans, as a model village to designs by Humphry Repton. The church, dedicated to All Saints, was rebuilt in 1867 but retains a mediaeval tower.

Laxton Hall 

Laxton Hall is a Grade II*-listed building between Laxton and Corby. It was much modified in the 19th century and altered again in 1867-8 for the seventh Lord Carbery.

In 1924 the Dominican friars opened a boys' boarding school called Blackfriars at Laxton Hall.

The hall has now been converted into a residential care home for the Polish community while keeping the integrity of the original architecture intact.

Since the 1970s there have been Corpus Christi events where a mass usually takes place in the afternoon which is then followed by a procession. In 2009 the mass was conducted by bishop Stanislaw Budzik and the following year by monsignor Stefan Wylezek. There was no event in 2011 but resumed in 2012 on 10 June with Wylezek again presiding. On 2 June 2013 former Primate of Poland Jozef Kowalczyk visited the hall and presided over the Corpus Christi celebrations. The 2014 celebrations were conducted by Cardinal Kazimierz Nycz. Bishop Damian Zimon presided over the 2015 procession; in attendance was Marek Jurek, a former marshal of the sejm as well as a candidate for the 2010 Polish presidential election. On 3 June 2018, Stefan Wylezek again presided over the Corpus Christi celebrations. During the COVID-19 pandemic the Corpus Christi was postponed but returned on 19 June 2022 with Wylezek presiding.

Amenities
Laxton Park Cricket Club plays in the Rutland and District Division 5.

Laxton Village Hall is a new building, completed in Spring 2013 thanks to funding from the Big Lottery Fund.

References

External links

Villages in Northamptonshire
Model villages
North Northamptonshire
Civil parishes in Northamptonshire
Laxton Hall